The Academy of Canadian Cinema & Television is a Canadian non-profit organization created in 1979 to recognize the achievements of the over 4,000 Canadian film industry and television industry professionals, most notably through the Canadian Screen Awards The mandate of the Academy is to honour outstanding achievements; to heighten public awareness of and increase audience attendance of and appreciationпа of Canadian film and television productions; and to provide critically needed, high-quality professional development programs, conferences and publications.

Background 
Since 2012, the Academy's primary national awards program is the Canadian Screen Awards, which were announced that year as a replacement for the formerly distinct Genie Award (for film) and Gemini Award (for television) ceremonies. The Prix Gémeaux for French-language television remains a separate awards program.

The organization also administers the Prism Prize for music videos.

The current chief executive officer is Tammy Frick, and the president of the board is John Young. The organization's previous CEO was Beth Janson, who left in April 2022 to take a job as chief operating officer of the Toronto International Film Festival.

Milestones 

 1979 — The Academy of Canadian Cinema is established
 1980 — The Etrog is renamed the Genie Award
 1980 — The 1st Genie Awards ceremony is held
 1985 — The organization is renamed the Academy of Canadian Cinema & Television
 1986 — The Gemini Award statuette is unveiled
 1987 — The 1st Prix Gémeaux ceremony is held
 1993 — The Claude Jutra Award is established to recognize first time directors
 Following the February 2016 publication of Yves Lever's biography of Jutra, containing allegations that Jutra had sexually abused underage children during his lifetime, the Academy announced that it was removing Jutra's name from the award. The award is now called the John Dunning Best First Feature Award.
 1995 — The Academy's official website, academy.ca, goes online
 2003 — Digital Media Awards are introduced at the 2010 Gemini Awards
 2008 — The Prix Gémeaux ceremony is webcast
 2012 — Academy announces the merger of its Gemini and Genie Awards programs into the Canadian Screen Awards

See also 
Canadian television awards
Cinema of Canada
National Film Board of Canada
Canadian Broadcasting Corporation

References

External links 
 Academy of Canadian Cinema & Television website
 
 CBC Digital Archives - Bright Lights, Political Fights: The Canadian Film Industry

Internet properties established in 1995
Non-profit organizations based in Toronto
Communications and media organizations based in Canada
1979 establishments in Ontario
 
Film organizations in Canada
Television organizations in Canada
Film-related professional associations